The 2021 Biella Challenger VII was a professional tennis tournament played on outdoor red clay courts. It was part of the 2021 ATP Challenger Tour. It took in Biella, Italy between 31 May and 6 June 2021.

Singles main-draw entrants

Seeds

 Rankings are as of 24 May 2021.

Other entrants
The following players received wildcards into the singles main draw:
  Flavio Cobolli
  Stefano Napolitano
  Luca Nardi

The following players received entry into the singles main draw as special exempts:
  Gastão Elias
  Holger Rune

The following players received entry from the qualifying draw:
  Jacopo Berrettini
  Raúl Brancaccio
  Hugo Grenier
  Camilo Ugo Carabelli

Champions

Singles

 Holger Rune def.  Marco Trungelliti 6–3, 5–7, 7–6(7–5).

Doubles

  Tomás Martín Etcheverry /  Renzo Olivo def.  Luis David Martínez /  David Vega Hernández 3–6, 6–3, [10–8].

References

2021 ATP Challenger Tour
Tennis tournaments in Italy
2021 in Italian tennis
May 2021 sports events in Italy
June 2021 sports events in Italy